Rage of Mages II: Necromancer is a role-playing game for Microsoft Windows that was developed by Nival and released in 1999. It is known as Allods 2: Master of Souls in Russia. It contains 43 missions and a multiplayer mode that allows play with up to 16 players.

The game is part of the Allods series of video games that also includes Rage of Mages, Evil Islands: Curse of the Lost Soul, Legends of Allods and Allods Online.

Reception

The game received mixed reviews according to the review aggregation website GameRankings. GameSpy said, "While the game is stable, looks and sounds okay, and has a great quest system, it fails to deliver on either strategy, role playing, or any other game elements well enough to keep things interesting or entertaining for very long."

References

External links
 
 
 Rage of Mages II multiplayer server with new advanced RPG progress

1999 video games
Monolith Productions games
Role-playing video games
Video games developed in Russia
Windows games
Windows-only games
Multiplayer and single-player video games